Pedro Miguel Marques da Costa Filipe (born 14 December 1980), known as Pepa, is a Portuguese football manager and former player who played as a forward. He is the current head coach of Brazilian club Cruzeiro.

Formed at Benfica, where he made seven first-team appearances, he spent most of his career in his country's second tier, making 63 appearances and scoring 13 goals for three clubs. He also played on loan at Lierse in the Belgian top flight and earned 14 youth caps for Portugal.

Pepa began working as a manager in 2013, leading four Primeira Liga sides.

Playing career
Born in Torres Novas, Santarém District, Pepa joined S.L. Benfica's youth system in 1994, aged 13. He made his competitive debut with the main squad on 23 January 1999, scoring in a Primeira Liga 3–1 home win against Rio Ave FC. After being touted as an early promise, he went on to appear mainly for the reserve team, also being loaned in March 2000 to Lierse S.K. in Belgium for a fee of 50 million Portuguese escudos.

In 2002, Pepa terminated his contract with Benfica which had four years remaining, following in the footsteps of fellow youth graduates Rui Baião and Jorge Ribeiro and signing with Varzim SC, a decision he later claimed as the worst mistake in his life. He ended his career in late 2007 at only 26, due to several knee injuries.

Coaching career
In summer 2013, after two years working with Benfica's youth sides, Pepa had his first head coaching experience, being appointed at A.D. Sanjoanense in the regional leagues and helping the club to promote to the third division at the first attempt. In 2015–16 he achieved the same feat with C.D. Feirense of the LigaPro, even though he did not finished the season after being replaced by José Mota for the final two months.

Pepa continued to work in the Portuguese top tier in the following years, with Moreirense F.C. and C.D. Tondela. During his two-year stint at the latter he successfully avoided relegation, but was not retained.

Having started the 2019–20 campaign without a club, Pepa replaced Filó at the helm of F.C. Paços de Ferreira after the fourth matchday, with the team last in the standings. In May 2021, after having led them to the fifth place and qualification to the inaugural edition of the UEFA Europa Conference League, he left the Estádio da Mata Real.

Days after leaving Paços, Pepa signed a three-year contract to manage Vitória de Guimarães. He led the team to sixth place in his only season, but he and his coaching staff were dismissed on 12 July 2022, days before the new campaign was due to open against Puskás Akadémia FC in the UEFA Europa Conference League.

On 19 July 2022, Pepa was handed his first foreign management job, at Al-Tai FC in the Saudi Professional League. In January 2023, following a 1–0 defeat to Al Wehda FC, he was relieved of his duties.

On 20 March 2023, Pepa switched teams and countries again after being announced as head coach of Campeonato Brasileiro Série A side Cruzeiro.

Career statistics

Managerial statistics

References

External links

1980 births
Living people
People from Torres Novas
Sportspeople from Santarém District
Portuguese footballers
Association football forwards
Primeira Liga players
Liga Portugal 2 players
Segunda Divisão players
S.L. Benfica footballers
S.L. Benfica B players
Varzim S.C. players
F.C. Paços de Ferreira players
S.C. Olhanense players
Belgian Pro League players
Lierse S.K. players
Portugal youth international footballers
Portuguese expatriate footballers
Expatriate footballers in Belgium
Portuguese expatriate sportspeople in Belgium
Portuguese football managers
Primeira Liga managers
Liga Portugal 2 managers
C.D. Feirense managers
Moreirense F.C. managers
C.D. Tondela managers
F.C. Paços de Ferreira managers
Vitória S.C. managers
Saudi Professional League managers
Al-Ta'ee managers
Cruzeiro Esporte Clube managers
Portuguese expatriate football managers
Expatriate football managers in Saudi Arabia
Expatriate football managers in Brazil
Portuguese expatriate sportspeople in Saudi Arabia
Portuguese expatriate sportspeople in Brazil